Putting Cumbria First, also known as CumbriaFirst, is a minor political party based in Penrith, Cumbria. It was founded in January 2019 by local businessman Jonathan Davies, with a vision of putting Cumbria's interests first.

Policies

The party's policies include: 
 Increasing funding for schools
 Universal access to 4G networks
 Fully dualling the A66 and A69 roads
 Scrapping the Police and Crime Commissioner for Cumbria
 Increasing front-line police 
 Support for a second Scottish Independence Referendum
 Opposition to local government cuts

The party's leader Jonathan Davies  supports giving city status to the town of Barrow-in-Furness.

Electoral performance
The Party Leader, Jonathan Davies, stood as an independent candidate for Penrith and the Border in the 2017 General Election. The party stood three candidates for election to both Eden District Council and Carlisle City Council at the May 2019 local elections, none were successful. The party's first local councillor, Michael Little, was elected to Allerdale District Council at the same election. Davies stood again as a candidate in the 2019 General Election, ultimately gaining 2.2% of the vote in Penrith and the Border.

References

Locally based political parties in England
Political parties established in 2019
2019 establishments in England